William Jauderell was an archer in the English armies in Wales of Edward, the Black Prince in the 14th century.

A descendant of Peter Jauderel, a soldier who had helped King Edward conquer Wales in the late 13th century, William Jauderell held estates in Cheshire and Macclesfield Forest registered in 1351, although he originally came from Yeardsley, in Derbyshire.  His son Roger Joudrell would later fight at the Battle of Agincourt in 1415, and was buried in the church of St James, Taxal, also in Derbyshire, where his grave is marked by a large plaque honouring William and others from the family.

On 16 December 1355, the Black Prince gave him leave to travel to England by means of a pass which his family keeps as an heirloom today.  The translated modern text reads, Know all that we, the Prince of Wales, have given leave on the day of the date of this instrument, to William Jauderel, one of our archers, to go to England. In witness of this we have caused our seal to be placed on this bill. Given at Bordeaux 16 December, in the year of grace 1355.

After travelling to England, Jauderell went back overseas, presumably to France where the Battle of Poitiers took place in September 1356, and he was recorded returning to England in 1356 when he was awarded two oak trees to repair his home at Whaley Bridge in Derbyshire, taken from Macclesfield Forest.

The name evolved from Jauderel to Jauderell to Joudrell, and from the late 15th century onwards, has been Jodrell. The name lives on in the site of the iconic Jodrell Bank Observatory in Cheshire.

See also 
 Jodrell Bank

References
Hardy, Robert The Longbow: A Social and Military History Patrick Stephens Publishing 1992 

English soldiers
British male archers
14th-century English military personnel
Year of death missing
Year of birth missing
People from Whaley Bridge